José Gusmão (born 20 July 1976) is a Portuguese politician currently serving as a Member of the European Parliament for the Left Bloc.

References

Living people
MEPs for Portugal 2019–2024
Left Bloc MEPs
Left Bloc politicians
1976 births